The 5th Execution is a 2010 Russian adventure film directed by Aleksandr Yakimchuk and Elena Kovaleva.

Cast
 Rutger Hauer as Khant
 Michael Madsen as Rik
 Fedor Emelianenko as himself
 Paweł Deląg as Ivan
 Kim Bo-sung as Chzhan Khen-Vu
 Alexey Gorbunov as General
 Valery Nikolaev as Sanya
 Valery Solovyov as Vadim
 Oleg Chernov as Tikhiy

References

External links 
 
 

2010 films
Russian action adventure films
2010s English-language films
English-language Russian films
2010s Russian-language films
2010s Korean-language films
2010s action adventure films
2010 multilingual films
Russian multilingual films